Echeveria cante, the white cloud plant, is a species of flowering plant in the family Crassulaceae, native to northwestern Zacatecas state in Mexico. A succulent, it has gained the Royal Horticultural Society's Award of Garden Merit.

References

cante
Endemic flora of Mexico
Flora of Northeastern Mexico
Plants described in 1997